The Waitangiroto River is a river of the West Coast Region of New Zealand's South Island. It flows northwest from its origins north of Whataroa to reach the Tasman Sea two kilometres north of the Okarito Lagoon. The lower reaches of the longer Waitangitāhuna River follow a roughly parallel course one kilometre to the north. Both rivers are linked to the Whataroa River, which reaches the Tasman three kilometres to the north of the Waitangiroto's mouth.

See also
List of rivers of New Zealand

References

Rivers of the West Coast, New Zealand
Westland District
Rivers of New Zealand